State Route 722 (SR 722) is an east–west state highway in the western portion of the U.S. state of Ohio.

Route description

SR 722 traverses the southern portion of Darke County for its entire length.  No portion of this highway is included within the National Highway System, a network of routes determined to be most important for the economy, mobility and defense of the nation.

History
SR 722 was established in 1937.  It was originally routed between US 127 in Castine and its present eastern terminus at SR 49 east of Gordon.  Two years later, the highway was extended west to its current western terminus at SR 121 southwest of New Madison.

Major intersections

References

722
Transportation in Darke County, Ohio